Bilsi  Assembly constituency is  one of the 403 constituencies of the Uttar Pradesh Legislative Assembly,  India. It is a part of the Badaun district and one  of the five assembly constituencies in the Badaun Lok Sabha constituency. First election in this assembly constituency was held in 1974 after the delimitation order was passed in 1967. After the "Delimitation of Parliamentary and Assembly Constituencies Order" was passed in 2008, the constituency was assigned identification number 114.

Wards  / Areas
Extent  of Bilsi Assembly constituency is KC Kaulhai of Sahaswan Tehsil; KC Ujhani,  Ujhani MB & Kachhla NP of Budaun Tehsil; KC Bilsi & Bilsi MB of Bilsi  Tehsil.

Members of the Legislative Assembly

Election results

2022

2012

See also
Badaun Lok Sabha constituency
Budaun district
Sixteenth Legislative Assembly of Uttar Pradesh
Uttar Pradesh Legislative Assembly
Vidhan Bhawan

References

External links
 

Assembly constituencies of Uttar Pradesh
Politics of Budaun district
Constituencies established in 1967